Diar Automobile Company (in Persian دیار خودرو) is an automobile company based in Golpayegan, Iran. Established in 2000, the company manufacturers SUVs and pick-ups under license from China's Changcheng, also known as Great Wall Motor. Diar also manufactures their own vehicles.  Their flagship vehicle, the Safir, is based on the Great Wall Wingle and shares a name with one of Iran's rockets.

History

Sazehaye Khodro Diar Manufacturing Co. was established in 2000 for the production of vehicle body pressed parts through investment made by private sector. By installation and setting up 6 units of 500 to 2000 tons hydraulic and Heavy Stroke Presses in January 2003, the Company managed to obtain the Exploitation License for body pressed parts.

In line with its developmental plans and recognizing vacant market capacity for pick-up and SUV in the country and in the region, this Company studied the feasibility to co-operate with a few world large vehicle manufacturing Companies to produce these products in Iran. The result of study and negotiations with the candidate Companies, led to the selection and conclusion of an agreement with Great Wall Motor of China. Following the agreement made with GWM Co. and having obtained the Establishment License for the production of 50,000 units of single and double cabin pick-ups as well as SUVs in 2004, the construction of a 50,000M² plant in an area of 140,000M² in Golpaigan township of Esfahan Province (golpayegan) has been started. Obtaining the Exploitation License and necessary permits from the Ministry of Industry and Mines, the Standard Bureau, the Environment Protection Organisation and other related organizations, Setad-e-Tabsareh 13 (13th. Note Headquarters) for instance, presently, as the first phase, through setting up of Final Painting Lines, assembling and testing of vehicle and by making use of CKD parts and partly procurement from local sources, has started the production and delivery of Diar single and double cabin pick-ups.

Current Products 
 BAIC D20 hatchback
 BAIC X25 crossover
 Diar BJ40 SUV
 Soueast DX3 crossover, actually a rebadged DX5
 Tigard X35 crossover

Former Products 
 BAIC Sabrina hatchback
 BAIC Senova sedan
 Great Wall Deer pickup
 Great Wall Wingle 3 pickup
 Great Wall Wingle 5 pickup 
 Great Wall Haval M4 crossover 
 Great Wall Haval H6 crossover

References

External links
Official Website (in English)
Official Sales Website (in Farsi)

Diar Automobile Company
Truck manufacturers of Iran
Vehicle manufacturing companies established in 2000